Alpha Noir/Omega White is the ninth full-length album by the Portuguese gothic metal band Moonspell, released on 27 April 2012. It is the band's first double album.
The band's press release cited Bathory, King Diamond, Onslaught, early Metallica, Testament and Artillery as influences for Alpha Noir, which was described as "an incendiary album". Omega White was instead described as an album of "pure atmosphere and shadow", an homage to Type O Negative and The Sisters of Mercy and similar to Moonspell's second album Irreligious. Alpha Noir and Omega White were both produced and mixed by Tue Madsen, who had previously worked on the band's Under Satanæ and Night Eternal records.

The song "New Tears Eve" has been dedicated to Peter Steele, the vocalist and leader of Type O Negative, who died in 2010.

Track listing

Personnel 
Fernando Ribeiro – vocals
Ricardo Amorim – guitars
Aires Pereira – bass
Pedro Paixão – keyboards, guitars
Miguel Gaspar – drums

Charts

References 

2012 albums
Moonspell albums
Napalm Records albums
Albums produced by Tue Madsen
Albums with cover art by Spiros Antoniou